The Star Hotel was a pub in the suburb of Balmain in the Inner West of Sydney, in the state of New South Wales, Australia.

The pub is located near the entrance to Mort's Dock and in 1902, the Ship Painters and Dockers Union took up a 'moveable office' at 95 Mort Street, next to the Star Hotel and undoubtedly supplied trade to the establishment.

The license and name were transferred in 1930 to the pub now known as The Cat and Fiddle Hotel on Darling Street. The building became a residential and commercial unit in 1994.

References
 Davidson, B; Hamey, K; Nicholls, D; Called To The Bar - 150 Years of pubs in Balmain & Rozelle, The Balmain Association, 1991, .
 Wyner, I; A history of the Ship Painters and Dockers Union 1900-1932, ch6, 2003.

Defunct hotels in Sydney
Hotel buildings completed in 1866
Hotels established in 1866
1866 establishments in Australia
1930 disestablishments in Australia
Balmain, New South Wales
Former pubs in Australia